Dunfee may refer to:

People 
Clive Dunfee, British race car driver
Evan Dunfee, Canadian race walker
Jack Dunfee, British race car driver
Nora Dunfee, American Broadway and film actress

Places 

Dunfee, Indiana, an unincorporated community in Whitley County